Tow-Arnett is a surname. Notable people with the surname include:

Jeff Tow-Arnett (born 1986), American football player
Jessica Susan Tow-Arnett (born 1986), American volleyball player

Compound surnames